Sarchí may refer to:

 Sarchí (canton), a canton in the Alajuela province of Costa Rica
 Sarchí Norte, a district of the Sarchí canton, in the Alajuela province of Costa Rica
 Sarchí Sur, a district of the Sarchí canton, in the Alajuela province of Costa Rica

See also
 Sarchi, Kurdistan, a village in Gavrud Rural District, Muchesh District, Kamyaran County, Kurdistan Province, Iran
 Philippe Sarchi (1764-1830), Italian lawyer and linguist